Human-centered computing may refer to:

 Human-centered computing, an academic discipline
 Human-centered computing (NASA), a subproject of NASA's intelligent systems project